C.V. Kunjiraman Memorial Higher Secondary School is a school in Kizhakkekallada, Kollam district, Kerala, India.

External links
 Official site

See also
 List of schools in India

References 

Schools in Kollam district
High schools and secondary schools in Kerala